Shanghai Open University, formerly known as Shanghai Television University, is an open university conducting distance education based on telecommunication, broadcasting and television, and computer and other technology based subject courses.

On July 25, 2012, the university officially changed its name to Shanghai Open University, and now offers Associate and bachelor's degrees. Bachelor's degrees offered now include Public Safety Management, Mechanical Electrical Engineering, and Software Engineering. Admissions is open, though conferring of degrees is based on met requirements.

History
The university was founded on 1960 as Shanghai TV University (SHTVU) "offering undergraduate education for adults."

While reports that during its early years the university functioned "simply [to] keep[] unemployed workers busy," and its diplomas were only "equal in status to those of a two-year college." By the mid-1960s the university had enrolled over 50,000 students but graduated only 12,000. Epstein regards this dysfunction as a typical example of policies in Chinese urban areas in the 1960s which "attempted to placate immediate political demands" but "proved to be counterproductive to long-term educational aims."

According to the Xinhua General Overseas News Service, from 1991 to 1993 the university added eight economic courses to its curriculum including industrial and commercial business management, auditing, and finance.

In 2003, student enrollment amounts to 100,000. By 2012 Shanghai TV University was renamed as Shanghai Open University with the approval of the Ministry of Education of China.

References

External links
 Shanghai Television University Website (archived)
 Shanghai Open University (English website)

Universities and colleges in Shanghai
Educational institutions established in 1960
1960 establishments in China